The Fletcher class was a class of destroyers built by the United States during World War II. Some went on to serve during the Korean War and into the Vietnam War.

The United States Navy commissioned 175 Fletcher-class destroyers between 1942 and 1944, more than any other destroyer class, and the design was generally regarded as highly successful. The  and  classes were Fletcher derivatives.

The long-range Fletcher-class ships performed every task asked of a destroyer, from anti-submarine warfare and anti-aircraft warfare to surface action. They could cover the vast distances required by fleet actions in the Pacific and served almost exclusively in the Pacific Theater of Operations during World War II, during which they accounted for 29 Imperial Japanese Navy submarines sunk. In a massive effort, the Fletchers were built by shipyards across the United States, and, after World War II ended, 11 were sold to countries that they had been built to fight against: Italy, Germany, and Japan, as well as other countries, where they had even longer, distinguished careers. Three have been preserved as museum ships in the U.S. and one in Greece.

Description
The Fletcher class (named for Admiral Frank F. Fletcher, Medal of Honor recipient) was the largest destroyer class ordered. It was also one of the most successful and popular with their crews. Compared to earlier classes built for the United States Navy, the Fletchers carried a significant increase in lethal firepower, including anti-aircraft (AA) weapons and increased armor plating; this contributed to greater displacement and overall weight and height increase. Their flush deck construction added structural strength; however, it did make them cramped, as less crew space was available below decks compared with a raised forecastle.

Design

The Fletcher class was the first generation of destroyers designed after the series of naval treaties that had limited ship designs heretofore. The growth in the design was in part a response to the challenge that had dogged U.S. Navy designs in coping with long range operations in the Pacific Ocean.  They were also to carry no fewer than five  guns and ten deck-mounted torpedo tubes on the centerline, allowing them to meet any foreign design on equal terms. Compared to earlier designs, the Fletchers were large, allowing them to adapt to evolving defensive priorities through the addition of two  Bofors quadruple mount AA guns as well as six  Oerlikon dual AA gun positions.  This addition to the AA suite required the deletion of the forward quintuple torpedo mount, a change done under the 4 April 1945 anti-kamikaze program.

Fletchers were also much less top-heavy than previous classes, allowing them to take on additional equipment and weapons without major redesign.

The first design inputs were in the fall of 1939 from questionnaires distributed around design bureaus and the Office of the Chief of Naval Operations. The design parameters were the armaments desired of the next destroyer. As such, the questions were of how many guns, torpedoes, and depth charges were seen as desirable. Also asked was at what point would the design grow large enough to become a torpedo target instead of a torpedo delivery system. The answer that came back was that five  dual-purpose guns, twelve torpedoes, and twenty-eight depth charges would be ideal, while a return to the 1,500-ton designs of the past was seen as undesirable. As with other previous U.S. flush deck destroyer designs, seagoing performance suffered. This was mitigated by deployment to the Pacific Ocean, which is relatively calm compared to the Atlantic.

Typically, Babcock & Wilcox boilers and General Electric geared steam turbines were equipped, although other designs and manufacturers were probably used to maximize the rate of production.

Armament

Main gun armament was five dual-purpose 5-inch/38 caliber (127 mm) guns in single Mk 30 turrets, guided by a Mark 37 Gun Fire Control System, including a Mk 12 fire control radar and a Mk 22 height-finder (replaced by the circular Mk 25 radar postwar) linked by a Mark 1A Fire Control Computer and stabilized by a Mk 6 8500 rpm gyroscope.

Ten  torpedo tubes were fitted in two quintuple mounts amidships, firing the 21-inch Mark 15 torpedo. Anti-submarine armament was two racks for  depth charges at the stern and six K-gun 300-pound depth charge throwers amidships.

Anti-aircraft armament initially was light, with a quadruple 1.1"/75 caliber gun located in an elevated tub between the number three and four 5-inch gun mounts and six Oerlikon 20 mm cannons (two in front of and below the bridge and four amidships). In June 1942, the 1.1" gun was replaced by a twin Bofors 40 mm gun mount; in some ships, another twin mount may have been added on the fantail between the depth charge racks. In February 1943, the fantail-mounted Bofors was removed and one twin mount was placed on each side of the aft funnel, bringing the total number of 40 mm to six.

In 1942 and 1943, the number of Oerlikon cannons was steadily increased with ships modified before leaving the shipyard with a seventh 20 mm mount in front of the bridge behind the number two 5" gun mount and anywhere from one to three mounts on the flying bridge depending upon the configuration of the ship. In combat, commanders often requisitioned additional guns with some ships mounting up to thirteen 20 mm cannons. In June and July 1943, two more twin Bofors mounts were added in place of the 20 mm cannons in front of and below the bridge, giving a total of ten. With this modification, the Oerlikon cannons were rearranged and their number was standardized at seven; four amidships and three in a heart-shaped mount on the fantail.

Due to the increasing threat from kamikaze attacks, beginning in July 1945 some ships returning to the United States for refits received further anti-aircraft modifications. The forward set of torpedo tubes was removed, providing space to replace the two amidships twin 40 mm guns with two quadruple mountings (for a total of fourteen). The seven single 20 mm guns were replaced with six twin mounts (four amidships and two on the fantail.

Three (and ) were built with aircraft catapults after deletion of the rear torpedo tube mount and the number 3 5-inch gun mount. This alteration was not a success and was not repeated. These three destroyers were later converted to the regular Fletcher-class configuration.

Service
Nineteen Fletchers were lost during World War II; six more were damaged, evaluated as constructive total losses, and not repaired. Postwar, the remainder were decommissioned and put into reserve.

Ships lost
, sunk by Japanese aircraft off Savo Island, 1 February 1943
, sunk by a Japanese destroyer group operating in the Kula Gulf, 5 July 1943
, scuttled after being torpedoed by a Japanese destroyer and accidentally rammed in the Naval Battle of Vella Lavella, 6 October 1943
, sunk by Japanese aircraft off Cape Gloucester, 26 December 1943
, sunk by Japanese surface ships in the Battle off Samar, 25 October 1944
, sunk by Japanese surface ships in the Battle off Samar, 25 October 1944
, sunk by kamikazes in Leyte Gulf, 1 November 1944
, foundered in Typhoon Cobra, 18 December 1944
, lost to a mine off Okinawa, 26 March 1945
, sunk by kamikazes off Okinawa, 6 April 1945
, sunk by kamikazes off Okinawa, 6 April 1945
, sunk by kamikazes off Okinawa, 16 April 1945
, sunk by kamikazes off Okinawa, 3 May 1945
, sunk by kamikazes off Okinawa, 4 May 1945
, sunk by kamikazes off Okinawa, 4 May 1945
, scuttled after running aground and receiving heavy shore fire south of Naha, Okinawa, 18 May 1945
, sunk by a kamikaze off Okinawa, 10 June 1945
, sunk by kamikazes off Okinawa, 16 June 1945
, sunk by Yokosuka K5Y kamikaze biplanes off Okinawa, 28 July 1945
, damaged by kamikazes off Okinawa, 6 April 1945. Decommissioned, 20 November 1945. Sold for scrap, 28 March 1946.
, damaged by kamikazes off Okinawa, 6 April 1945. Decommissioned, 6 December 1945. Sold for scrap, 17 June 1947.
, damaged by a suicide boat off Okinawa, 27 April 1945. Decommissioned, 30 November 1945. Sold for scrap, January 1948.
, damaged by kamikazes off Okinawa, 29 April 1945. Decommissioned, 1 November 1945. Sold for scrap, 3 March 1946.
, damaged by kamikazes off Okinawa, 11 May 1945. Decommissioned, 7 November 1945. Sold for scrap, 11 February 1947.
, damaged by kamikazes off Okinawa, 20 May 1945. Decommissioned, 23 November 1945. Sold for scrap, 23 January 1948.

Korean War
With the outbreak of the Korean War many were returned to active duty. During this time 39 were refitted under project SCB 74A, reducing their overall main armament and the number of torpedo tubes to accommodate other weapons. A new ahead-throwing weapon called Weapon Alpha was installed in many of the ships. Others carried trainable Hedgehogs. Eighteen ships were redesignated as escort destroyers (DDE), optimized for anti-submarine warfare; these reverted to destroyer (DD) designation in 1962.

Other navies
Many of the ships were sold to other navies during the mid-1950s, including:

Any remaining were broken up in the 1970s. The last Fletcher in service, BAM Cuitlahuac (ex-John Rodgers), left the Mexican navy in 2001, meaning the total service life of the Fletchers stretched over almost six decades and into the 21st century.

Surviving ships

Four Fletcher-class destroyers are preserved as museum ships. Three are in the United States and one is in Greece, although only Kidd retains her World War II configuration.

Velos is the only vessel still in commission. Velos alongside G. Averof are ceremonially commissioned by the Hellenic Navy having Palaio Faliro as their base. Their crew are active Officers of Hellenic Navy. Velos still retains its complete armament and equipment (as modernized in 1950s). In September 2019 its crew took her to Thessaloniki for a short 3-month stay. , she remains in Thessaloniki and she has been visited by over 157.000 visitors.

All three American museum ships have been designated as National Historic Landmarks.

Surviving ships
, in Buffalo, New York
, in Baton Rouge, Louisiana
, in Boston, Massachusetts
Velos (D16), in Palaio Faliro, Greece

Surviving parts 
 USS Fletcher (DD-445), in National Museum of the United States Navy, Washington, D.C.
USS Radford (DD-446), in USS Orleck Naval Museum, Louisiana
USS Nicholas (DD-449), in Veterans' Wall of Honor, Ohio and at Center House, Marine Barracks, Washington, D.C.
USS Renshaw (DD-499), in Portsmouth Naval Shipyard Museum, Virginia
USS Foote (DD-511), in National Museum of the Pacific War, Texas
USS Hailey (DD-556), on a naval base in Rio de Janeiro, Brazil
USS Smalley (DD-565), in Freedom Park, Omaha, Nebraska
USS Dyson (DD-572), in Heritage Veterans Memorial Plaza, Texas
 USS Izard (DD-589), in Ohio State University, Ohio
USS Caperton (DD-650), aboard USS Kidd (DD-661), in Baton Rouge, Louisiana
 USS Knapp (DD-653), in Columbia River Maritime Museum, Oregon
USS Chauncey (DD-667), aboard USS Kidd (DD-661), in Baton Rouge, Louisiana
USS Monssen (DD-798), in Freedom Park, Nebraska
Zerstörer 1 (D170) or Zerstörer 6 (D180), in Bundeswehr Military History Museum, Dresden
Zerstörer 6 (D180), in Marbeck-Heiden train station, Marbeck
ROCS Ching Yang (DD-9), in Yuanzhiluxiuxian Park, Tainan City and Táinán jūn shǐ gōngyuán Park, Tainan City
ROKS Chungmu (DD-91), in Yongsan War Memorial, Seoul
TCG İçel (D-344), in Derince Naval Base,Kocaeli, Turkey.

Notes

In 2018, Kidd was used as the filming location for the fictional USS Keeling DD-548 (codenamed Greyhound), from C.S. Forester's novel The Good Shepherd, in her appearance in the book's 2020 cinematic adaptation, Greyhound.

On 14 April 2022, museum ship USS The Sullivans sank at her Pier in the Buffalo Naval Park. The depth of water prevented complete sinking. Since then, the ship has been refloated and restoration of the ship's electric system and interior spaces is ongoing.

Ships in class
See List of Fletcher-class destroyers

See also
 List of destroyer classes of the United States Navy

References

Bibliography

External links

Fletcher-class destroyers at Destroyer History Foundation
Tin Can Sailors @ destroyers.org – Fletcher class destroyer 
Destroyers Online, Fletcher class

Destroyer classes